Het Arubaanse Padvindsters Gilde (APG, The Aruban Guild of Girl Guides) is the national Guiding organization of Aruba. It serves 326 members (as of 2017). Founded in 1941, the girls-only organization became an associate member of the World Association of Girl Guides and Girl Scouts in 1993 and a full member in 2017.

Program sections
The association is divided in four sections according to age:
 Beyisimas - ages 5 to 7 - Pink shirt
 Brownie - ages 7 to 11 - yellow shirt
 Guide - ages 11 to 17 - light blue shirt
 Pioneers - ages 17 to 21 

The Girl Scout Motto is Wees Bereid, Be Prepared in Papiamento and Dutch.

Emblem
The badge of Het Arubaanse Padvindsters Gilde is based on the badge of the former Dutch Girl Scouts organisation,  Het Nederlands Padvindsters Gilde. The badge consists of a ten-point star for the ten points of the Girl Scout law on a Trefoil for Girl Scouting/Guiding.

References

See also
Scouting Aruba

World Association of Girl Guides and Girl Scouts member organizations
Scouting and Guiding on Aruba
Youth organizations established in 1941